Samuel Singer (August 27, 1912 – January 25, 2001) was an American animator and animation producer. He is best known as executive producer of The Adventures of Pow Wow, a cartoon which also later appeared as a segment of early episodes Captain Kangaroo. He also directed The Adventures of Paddy the Pelican and produced Bucky and Pepito. Animation historian Jerry Beck has referred to Singer as "the Ed Wood of animation" for his low-budget and generally ill-reviewed cartoons.

Career 

Singer was born on August 27 of 1912 as Samuel Singer to Abraham and Ida Singer. In his early career, he worked at Walt Disney Productions before leaving to pursue his animation career. Before that, Singer also worked for various other animation studios located in Hollywood. In 1949, Singer created Adventures of Pow Wow, which received generally negative reviews from critics, naming it as one of the worst television series of all time. He also created and executive produced The Adventures of Paddy the Pelican, Bucky and Pepito, and Courageous Cat and Minute Mouse. His final cartoon that he ever worked on was Sinbad Jr. and His Magic Belt. Instead of the show being created by Singer, he served as executive producer while William Hanna and Joseph Barbera (founders of Hanna-Barbera along with George Sidney) created the show. The negative reception of his shows led to his retirement after Sinbad Jr. and His Magic Belt ended in 1966.

Death 
Singer died on January 25, 2001, at the age of 88.

Filmography

Television 
Adventures of Pow Wow (1949–1955) - Director
The Adventures of Paddy the Pelican (1950–1954) - Creator, writer, director, and voice of Paddy the Pelican and various
Bucky and Pepito (1959–1960) - Executive producer
Courageous Cat and Minute Mouse (1960–1962) - Executive producer
Sinbad Jr. and His Magic Belt (1965–1966) - Executive producer

References

Further reading

External links

1912 births
2001 deaths
American animators
American animated film directors
American animated film producers
American television directors
American television producers